Tails is an album by Lisa Loeb & Nine Stories, released in 1995 by Geffen Records. Earlier versions of the songs "It's Over," "Snow Day," "Do You Sleep?", and "Hurricane" originally appeared on Loeb's previous studio album Purple Tape. Tails was peaked at number thirty on the US Billboard 200, In New Zealand it peaked on the top ten on the chart at number six on the New Zealand Albums (RMNZ) and number fifteen Canada Top Albums (RPM), Overall the album charted on seven countries making it a moderate success. Tails received a Gold certification in the United States after four months of its release with more than 500,000 pure copies sold in 1995, As of 2013 the album has sold 727,000 copies in the US In was also Gold in Music Canada with 50,000 copies sold.

Reception
The album was well received by the public, as it was certified Gold by the RIAA on December 1, 1995. Critics were also favorable to the album, with Ken Tucker of Entertainment Weekly, in particular, noting that "Loeb has an undeniable gift for creating an air of intimacy and vulnerability, which may well be enough for 'Stay' fans looking for additional doses of contemplative melancholy."

Track listing

Charts

References

External links
 
 

1995 albums
Lisa Loeb albums
Geffen Records albums